Kaluwal Mittha are two small villages in Renala Khurd, Okara District, Punjab, Pakistan.

Near cities 

Renala Khurd
Okara City
Dipalpur

Villages nearby 
 Mittha Bhatti
 Bama Bala
 Chuchak
 Kamman
 Bazida
 K plot
 Thatti Kalasan
 Islampur
Chak 4GD
 Chak 3GD Lahori Wala
 Chak 2GD Lasian Wala
 Thatta Bhattian
 Sakhi Abdaal

Kaluwal Cricket Team 

Kaluwal Kings Xi Kaluwal Cricket Team, Kaluwal Kings Xi Cricket Team, Kaluwal Mittha, Kalowal Mitha, Kaluwal Okara Punjab Pakistan, Kaluwal Okara, Kaluwal Punjab Pakistan, Kaluwal Pakistan Kaluwal Map, Kaluwal Cricket Team Picture, Mitha Kaluwal, Mitha Bhatti, Mitha Kalowal, Kaluwal Kings, Kalowal Kings Xi, Kaluwal kings Xi Video, Kalowal kings Xi Video, Kings Xi Punjab, Kaluwal Kings Xi PunjaPakistan, kings xi punjab team 2018, kings xi punjab team, kings xi punjab match, kings xi punjab song, kings xi punjab logo, kings xi punjab roster, kings xi punjab team 2018 players list, cricket team shirts, cricket team kaluwal,

Kaluwal Masjid 

Jamia Masjid Faizan e Madina Kaluwal

External links 
Official Website
YouTube Channel
Facebook Page

Villages in Pakistan